Kristijan Manević (born November 5, 1987) is a Macedonian professional basketball player for KK Kumanovo of the Macedonian First League (basketball).

References

External links
 Basketball Profile

1987 births
Living people
Macedonian men's basketball players
Sportspeople from Kumanovo
Power forwards (basketball)
Macedonian people of Serbian descent